Redon is a commune in the Ille-et-Vilaine department in Brittany in northwestern France. It is a sub-prefecture of the department.

Geography
Redon borders the Morbihan and Loire-Atlantique departments.

It is situated at the junction of the Oust and Vilaine rivers and Nantes-Brest canal, which makes it well known for its autumn and winter floods.

It is located at 50 km from Nantes, Rennes, Vannes and their airports

The town has a station which connects to Quimper and Rennes then Paris in 2h05.

History
Very little information exists about this area before 832, however it would seem that there was a parish by the name of Riedones which gave the town its name. In 832, Conwoion, a Breton monk with the help of the Carolingian Emperor Louis the Pious founded the abbey of Saint-Sauveur de Redon. Today, documents relating to the life of the abbey still exist.

The town developed around the abbey until a small rural community of 6,000 inhabitants was formed in the 1960s.

In the Middle Ages, Redon benefitted from maritime commerce due to its location on the Vilaine.

Population
Inhabitants of Redon are called Redonnais/Redonnaises in French.

Breton language
The municipality launched a linguistic plan through Ya d'ar brezhoneg on 10 October 2008.

In 2008, 14.31% of primary-school children attended bilingual schools.

Economy
 Cargill Texturising Systems - A pectin factory
 Faurecia, subsidiary of Peugeot-Citroën.
 Bic - business making lighters, razors and pens among other things (with only lighters being made in Redon)
 Eis

Cultural life
 Fête de la Chataigne (sweet chestnut festival) in October.
 Festival de la Bogue d'Or (Festival of songs and music from Upper Brittany)
 On Monday 4 July, the third stage of the 2011 Tour de France ended in Redon. The  stage, which was won by Tyler Farrar, was the first time the Tour had passed through Redon.

International relations

Redon is twinned with:
 Andover, United Kingdom.
 Goch, Germany.

See also
Communes of the Ille-et-Vilaine department
The works of Jean Fréour Statue of St Conwoïon sculptor

References

External links

 Official Site of Redon 

Communes of Ille-et-Vilaine
Subprefectures in France
Populated coastal places in France